Henry Wakefield was a medieval Bishop of Worcester.

Wakefield was elected on 12 September 1375 and consecrated on 28 October 1375.

Wakefield briefly served as Lord High Treasurer in 1377.

Wakefield died on 11 March 1395.

Citations

References
 "Bishops of Worcester, 1268–1543" British History Online Retrieved 29 December 2015.
 

Bishops of Worcester
Lord High Treasurers of England
1395 deaths
14th-century English Roman Catholic bishops
Year of birth unknown